Elections were held in Minnesota on Tuesday, November 6, 2012. Primary elections took place on August 14, 2012.

Federal

United States Senate 

Democratic–Farmer–Labor candidate Senator Amy Klobuchar stood for re-election. She was opposed by Republican state Representative Kurt Bills.

United States House of Representatives

All eight seats of the Minnesota delegation in the United States House of Representatives were up for election in 2012.  All eight incumbents were seeking re-election.

State

Ballot measures

Two constitutional amendments regarding same-sex marriage and voter identification were on the ballot.

Minnesota Senate

All 67 seats in the Minnesota Senate were up for election in 2012.

Minnesota House of Representatives

All 134 seats in the Minnesota House of Representatives were up for election in 2012.

Local
Many elections for local offices were also held on November 6, 2012.

References

External links
Elections & Voting at the Minnesota Secretary of State office

 
Minnesota